Philip Ridley (born 1957) is an English storyteller working in a wide range of artistic media.

As a visual artist he has been cited as a contemporary of the 'Young British Artists', and had his artwork exhibited internationally.

As a novelist he has created fiction for both children and adults and has had particular success and recognition as a children's author.

In the field of cinema he is perhaps best known for his award-winning screenplay for the 1990 film, The Krays (1990), a biopic about the Kray twins which was directed by Peter Medak. As a filmmaker in his own right he is recognised for creating a loose trilogy of horror films: The Reflecting Skin (1990), The Passion of Darkly Noon (1995) and Heartless (2009) for which he has acquired a cult following.

As a playwright he has been described as "a pioneer of In-yer-face theatre", which is a style and sensibility of drama that characterised many new plays that were performed in Britain during the 1990s. Ridley's debut play, The Pitchfork Disney (1991), is considered by many to be a seminal work that influenced the development of this form of theatre, with one critic even dubbing it "the key play" of the 1990s. A great number of his plays for adults have been perceived as controversial, being met with both condemnation and high acclaim upon their initial reception. As a writer for the stage he is also recognised for creating an ongoing series of plays for young people (The Storyteller Sequence) and has written theatrical works for children and family audiences.

As a songwriter he has created songs for his cinematic and theatrical works, frequently collaborating with composer Nick Bicât. He and Bicât have also formed a music group called Dreamskin Cradle with singer Mary Leay. Ridley has also written songs for composer Anna Meredith, particularly operatic work.

Ridley is also a poet, photographer, and performance artist and has written drama for radio.

Although Ridley creates stories through a wide range of media, he dislikes his work being categorised by the medium in which it is told, often referring to them belonging to each other as "different peaks of the same mountain."

Biography 
Ridley was born in Bethnal Green in the East End of London, where he lived and worked for the majority of his life until moving to Ilford. Ridley studied painting at Saint Martin's School of Art, and his work has been exhibited throughout Europe and Japan. He started as both a performance artist and the creator of a long sequence of charcoal drawings called The Epic of Oracle Foster. One drawing from this sequence, "Corvus Cum", portraying a man ejaculating a black bird, was exhibited at the ICA in London while Ridley was still a student and – with calls for it to be displayed behind a curtain – became a cause célèbre. Ridley also started his own theatre group as a student, acting in many of the productions, and made several short art films.

Work in literature

Ridley has written three books for adults: Crocodilia (1988), In the Eyes of Mr. Fury (1989), and Flamingoes in Orbit (1990).

His children's novels include Mercedes Ice (1989), Dakota of the White Flats (1989), Krindlekrax (1991) (winner of both the Smarties Prize and the WH Smith Mind-Boggling Book Award), Meteorite Spoon (1994), Kasper in the Glitter (1994) (nominated for the Whitbread Prize), Scribbleboy (1997) (shortlisted for the Carnegie Medal), Zinderzunder (1998), Vinegar Street (2000), Mighty Fizz Chilla (2002) (shortlisted for the Blue Peter Book of the Year Award), and Zip's Apollo (2005). He also has written two short stories for younger children, Dreamboat Zing (1996) and The Hooligan's Shampoo (1996).

Work in cinema

After graduating from St Martin's, Ridley created the short film, Visiting Mr Beak (1987), which starred the veteran actor Guy Rolfe. He later created a short film for Channel 4 called The Universe of Dermot Finn (1988), which featured renowned actress Sheila Hancock and was officially selected for the Cannes Film Festival, where it was a critical success and went on to receive theatrical distribution.

While still a student at St Martin's, Ridley wrote a screenplay for The Krays (1990), which was directed by Peter Medak and starred real life brothers Gary Kemp and Martin Kemp, who previously were recognised for their band, Spandau Ballet.

Ridley has also directed three feature films from his own screenplays: The Reflecting Skin (1990) (winner of 11 international awards), The Passion of Darkly Noon (1995) (winner of the Best Director Prize at the Porto Film Festival), and Heartless (2009). Ridley's third film as writer-director, Heartless, premiered at the Frightfest horror film festival in London in August 2009. The film stars Jim Sturgess, Clémence Poésy, Noel Clarke, Eddie Marsan, Luke Treadaway, Ruth Sheen, and Timothy Spall, and was released in the UK in May 2010. It was the first mainstream British film to be released across all platforms (theatrical, DVD, Blu-ray, download) at the same time.

In 1996 Hungary's Titanic Film Festival had a major retrospective of Ridley's work.

Work in theatre

Ridley has written 15 adult stage plays: the seminal The Pitchfork Disney (1990), the multi-award-winning The Fastest Clock in the Universe (1992), Ghost from a Perfect Place (1994), Vincent River (2000), the controversial Mercury Fur (2005), Leaves of Glass (2007), Piranha Heights (2008), Tender Napalm (2011), Shivered (2012), Dark Vanilla Jungle (2013), Radiant Vermin (2015), Tonight with Donny Stixx (2015), Karagula (2016), and The Poltergeist (2020).

Ridley has also written various monologues, many of which have been selectively performed together onstage. This includes Killer (consisting of the monologues Killer, Sledgehammers, and Vesper) performed in 2017, Angry (consisting of the monologues Angry, Okay, Bloodshot, Dancing, Now, and Air) performed in 2018, and The Beast Will Rise (consisting of the monologues Performance, Gators, Star, Rosewater, and Cactus) performed in 2020.

Ridley is additionally known for his series of plays for young people (known collectively as The Storyteller Sequence), consisting of Karamazoo (2004), Fairytaleheart (1998), Moonfleece (2004), Sparkleshark, and Brokenville (2003).

He has also written two plays for young children, Daffodil Scissors (2004) and Krindlekrax (2002) - a stage adaptation of his successful children's novel of the same name - as well as a play for the whole family, Feathers in the Snow (2012).

Ridley was one of 25 contemporary British writers asked to contribute a scene to NT25 Chain Play, celebrating 25 years of the Royal National Theatre in London.

Work in music

Ridley's output as a lyricist has produced a wide range of songs, a number of which have featured in a variety of his plays, films, and novels. As a student Ridley participated in music by creating work with a band called Haunted Staircase (who released their double-sided record Flutters in the early 1980s) and also worked as a DJ at a nightclub.

As a songwriter he has regularly collaborated with the composer, Nick Bicât. For Ridley's film, The Passion of Darkly Noon, they created two songs: "Look What You've Done" (sung by Gavin Friday) and "Who Will Love Me Now?" (sung by PJ Harvey), the latter of which was voted as BBC Radio 1's Best Film Song of 1998. It was later covered by the techno/house band Sunscreem as Please Save Me, whose cover entered the UK top 40 chart, became a cult hit in clubs, and featured in the film South West 9. For his film Heartless Ridley and Bicât created ten songs (performed by Mary Leay, Joe Echo, and lead actor Jim Sturgess).

In 2010 Ridley and Bicât formed the music group, 'Dreamskin Cradle' (with singer Mary Leay). The group's first album, Songs from Grimm (2014), consisted of twelve songs inspired by female characters in Brothers Grimm fairy tales and was released on all major download sites. Some songs from the album were performed as part of a live performance called Grimm Tales, which was developed by the St Paul's Institute and featured readings from the actress Jeany Spark, reflections from Canon Edmund Newell, and extracts from Brothers Grimm fairy tales adapted by poet laureate Carol Ann Duffy. Dreamskin Cradle have also released two singles: Fade and Float (written for Ridley's stage play, Tender Napalm) and Ladybird First (written for Ridley's stage play, Dark Vanilla Jungle).

Ridley also has written the libretto of an opera for teenagers titled Tarantula in Petrol Blue, composed by Anna Meredith, which had its premiere in 2009.

Other artistic work

Riley is a photographer, with his images appearing on the covers of a number of his published plays. He also has had a number of photography exhibitions mainly consisting of portraits of his friends and images of East London.

Ridley is also a poet, with some of his poetry published in a number of anthologies, and has earned a following for his ongoing series of performance poetry, Lovesongs for Extinct Creatures.

Ridley has won both the Evening Standards Most Promising Newcomer to British Film and Most Promising Playwright Awards. He is the only person ever to receive both prizes.

He featured on BBC2's flagship arts programme, The Culture Show, on 2 March 2012.

List of works (incomplete)

Literature

Works for Adults
 1986 – Embracing Verdi (short story) 
 1987 – Leviathan (short story)
 1988 – Crocodilia (novella)
 1989 –  In the Eyes of Mr. Fury (novel, expanded and rewritten version published in 2016)
 1990 – Flamingoes in Orbit (short story collection, rewritten new version published in 2018)
 1995 – Alien Heart (short story) 
 1997 – Introduction to Philip Ridley Plays: 1 (semi-autobiographical prose, extended and updated versions published in 2002 and 2012) 
 1998 – Wonderful Insect (short story)
 2009 – Introduction to Philip Ridley Plays: 2 (semi-autobiographical prose)
 2021 – Sunday (short story)   

Works for Children
 1989 – Mercedes Ice (novel)
 1989 – Dakota of the White Flats (novel)
 1991 – Krindlekrax (novel)
 1994 – Meteorite Spoon (novel)
 1995 – Kasper in the Glitter (novel)
 1997 – Scribbleboy (novel)
 1998 – Zinderzunder (novel)
 2000 – Vinegar Street (novel)
 2002 – Mighty Fizz Chilla (novel)
 2005 – Zip's Apollo (novel)

Works for Younger Children
 1996 – The Hooligan's Shampoo (short story)
 1996 – Dreamboat Zing (short story)

Poetry

Ongoing performance sequence - Lovesongs for Extinct Creatures:
 Your Love
 Dark Sky Craving
 The Silver Hat
 I'm Waiting to be Killed
 The Seams

Performance sequence - Heartbeat on the Horizon:
 Press Conference
 After
 Flash Boom
 Shrapnel
 I Will

Miscellaneous poetry:
 The Dying Lizard Man
 Someone Wants to Kill Me Again
 Getting Through The Day
 The Prince and the Snail
 Waiting For Faces To Fall
 I Am The Boy
 Sparkling Cannibals

Theatre

Adult Stage Plays
 1991 – The Pitchfork Disney
 1992 – The Fastest Clock in the Universe
 1994 – Ghost from a Perfect Place
 2000 – Vincent River
 2001 – NT25 Chain Play (produced for The National Theatre's 25th anniversary, featuring 25 scenes each written by a different playwright, with Ridley writing the second scene. The script was published on the National Theatre's website.)
 2005 – Mercury Fur
 2007 – Leaves of Glass
 2008 – Piranha Heights
 2011 – Tender Napalm
 2012 – Shivered
 2013 – Dark Vanilla Jungle (monologue)
 2015 – Radiant Vermin
 2015 – Tonight with Donny Stixx (monologue)
 2016 – Karagula
 2020 – The Poltergeist (monologue)
 2021 – Tarantula (monologue)

Libretto
 2007 – On Such A Day (short operatic piece)
 2009 – Tarantula in Petrol Blue (opera for teenagers)

Plays for Young People (The Storyteller Sequence)
 1997 – Sparkleshark (professional premiere in 1999)
 1998 – Fairytaleheart (also worked as the director of the original stage production)
 2000 – Brokenville (performed earlier as a work-in-progress under the title Apocalyptica in 1998)
 2004 – Moonfleece (professional premiere in 2010)
 2004 – Karamazoo (monologue)
Play for the Whole Family
 2012 – Feathers in the Snow

Plays for Children
 2000 – Scribbleboy (adapted by Ridley from his children's novel of the same name. Play unproduced and script unpublished)
 2002 – Krindlekrax (adapted by Ridley from his children's novel of the same name)
 2004 – Daffodil Scissors

Monologues (sometimes performed as Live Art)
 1986 – Vesper (first performed as a live art piece by Ridley in the Ten Painters Exhibition at St Martins School of Art)
 ???? – Bloodshot
 ???? – Angry
 ???? – Vooosh!
 ???? – Now
 ???? – Okay
 ???? – Wound
 ???? – It
 2013 – Dark Vanilla Jungle
 2015 – Tonight with Donny Stixx
 2017 – Killer
 2017 – Sledgehammers
 2018 – Dancing 
Monologues presented as theatre pieces:
 2017 – Killer (a theatrical presentation of three monologues: Killer, Sledgehammers, and Vesper)
 2018 – Angry (a theatrical presentation of six monologues: Angry, Okay, Bloodshot, Dancing, Now, and Air) 
 2020 – The Beast Will Rise (a theatrical presentation of five monologues: Performance, Gators, Star, Rosewater, and Cactus)
 2020 – The Poltergeist
 2021 – Tarantula
Online monologues:
 2014 - Mercury Fur - New Monologues (Four monologues written by Ridley to promote The Greenhouse Theatre Company's production of Mercury Fur transferring to the West End: Elliot, Naz, Lola, Darren. Presented on The Greenhouse Theatre Company's YouTube channel.)
 2020 - The Beast Will Rise (a series of monologues in response to Coronavirus performed by the cast of Ridley's postponed play The Beast of Blue Yonder: Gators, Zarabooshka, Chihuahua, Origami, Wound, Telescope, River, Eclipse, Performance, Star, Night, Puzzle, Snow, Rosewater, Cactus. Presented online at The Beast Will Rise (Tramp) )

Radio plays
 1989 – October Scars the Skin (script unpublished)
 1989 – The Aquarium of Coincidences (script unpublished)
 1991 – Shambolic Rainbow (script unpublished)

Film

Feature Films
 1990 – The Krays (screenwriter)
 1990 – The Reflecting Skin (director and screenwriter)
 1995 – The Passion of Darkly Noon (director and screenwriter)
 2010 – Heartless (director and screenwriter)

Short Films
 1987 – Visiting Mr Beak (director and screenwriter)
 1988 – The Universe of Dermot Finn (director and screenwriter)

Songs

As part of Dreamskin Cradle (with Nick Bicât)

2011 – From the stage play Tender Napalm
 Fade and Float (sung by Mary Leay)

2013 – From the stage play Dark Vanilla Jungle
 Ladybird First (sung by Mary Leay)

2014 – From the Album Songs from Grimm
 The Path You Know (sung by Mary Leay)
Fearless (sung by Mary Leay)
Waiting For You (sung by Mary Leay)
Don't Call Me Magic (sung by Mary Leay)
Not Here (sung by Mary Leay)
Did That Just Happen (sung by Mary Leay)
Things Will Change (sung by Mary Leay)
Somewhere Something's Spinning (sung by Mary Leay)
I Found You (Sung by Mary Leay)
A Million Magic Things (sung by Mary Leay)
Bring You Back (sung by Mary Leay)
Tenderly Tender Me (sung by Mary Leay)

Songs in Cinematic Works

1995 – From the film The Passion of Darkly Noon (music Nick Bicât)
 Who Will Love Me Now? (sung by PJ Harvey)
 Look What You've Done (To My Skin) (sung by Gavin Friday)

2010 – From the film Heartless (music Nick Bicât)
 Heartless (sung by Jim Sturgess)
 This Is The World We Live In (sung by Joe Echo)
 What Skin Is All About (sung by Joe Echo)
 The Other Me (sung by Joe Echo)
 Lie to Me (sung by Joe Echo)
 It Must Be Somewhere (sung by Mary Leay)
 The Darker It Gets (sung by Joe Echo)
 In You Are All The Stories (sung by Joe Echo)
 Beautiful (sung by Joe Echoe)
 Phoenix in Dynamite Sky (sung by Joe Echo)

Other musical works

198? – From the record single Flutters (double sided record featuring Philip Ridley as part of the band Haunted Staircase)
 Side A: Flutters (A New Kind of Lovesong)
 Side B: Something for the Children (A New Kind of Lullaby)

2009 – Fin Like a Flower (music by Anna Meredith, sung by Michael Chance. On the album The NMC Songbook)

2009 – Songless (music by Anna Meredith. Premiered at the Twickenham Choral Society. Unreleased)

2010 – Heal You (music by Anna Meredith, sung by Juice Vocal Ensemble. Performed as part of Laid Bare: 10 love songs. Released as a single in 2014)

2016 – Love and Defection (Mix-tape made for The Voice of Cassandre, a French Radio show which invites international artists to create their own mix-tapes.)

Exhibitions

Group Shows
 1981 – New Contemporaries, ICA, London.
 1982 – New Contemporaries, ICA, London.
 1983 – Christie's Student Show, Christie's, London.
 1984 – The Leicester Exhibition, Leicester.
 1985 – Open Drawing Exhibition, Tettenhall Gallery, Wolverhampton.
 1985 – Open Exhibition, Lamont Gallery, London.
 1986 – Ten Painters, 7th Floor Gallery, St. Martin's School of Art, London.
 1986 – Summer Exhibition, Bernard Baron Gallery, London.
 1987 – Group Show, Tom Allen Centre, London.
 1987 – Selected Show, Lamont Gallery, London.
 1987 – Young Contemporaries, Birch & Conran, London.
 1988 – Decency, Discreetly Bizarre Gallery, London.
 1988 – Selected Show, Lamont Gallery, London.
 1988 – Mendacity, Discreetly Bizarre Gallery, London.
 1988 – Magical Cats, Lamont Gallery, London.
 1988 – Art Jonction International, Nice, France.
 1988 – Bergamo Art Fair, Bergamo, Italy.
 1996 – Freezeframe, Lamont Gallery, London.
 2011 – Behind The Eyes, The Sassoon Gallery, London. (Photographic portraits. Behind The Eyes was a community arts project inspired by Ridley's play Mercury Fur)   

Solo Shows
 1985 – The Roaring Dreams Show, Tom Allen Centre, London.
 1985 – The Feeling Landscapes Show, Bernard Baron Gallery, London.
 1985 – The Glittering Gargolyes Show, The Fallen Angel, London.
 1986 – Mermaids, Monsters and Sleeping Moons, Mermaid Theatre, London.
 1986 – Recent Images, The Fallen Angel, London.
 1986 – The Epic of Oracle Foster, Lamont Gallery, London.
 1987 – Shy Moon, The Garden Gallery, London.
 1989 – The Vinegar Blossoms, Lamont Gallery, London.
 2007 – Recent Portraits, The Soho Theatre, London (photography exhibition)
 2007 – East London, Trafalgar Studios, London (photography exhibition)
 2008 – Recent Portraits 2, The Soho Theatre, London (photography exhibition)
 2017 – Rebels and Rubble, Shoreditch Town Hall, London (mini photography exhibition)

Selected works in anthologies 
 1987 – Short Story Embracing Verdi in the anthology Oranges and Lemons: Stories by Gay Men (edited by David Rees and Peter Robbins)
 1988 – Short Story Leviathan in the anthology 20 Under 35: Original Stories by Britain's Best New Young Writers (edited by Peter Straus)
 1995 – Short Story Alien Heart in Projections 4½ (edited by John Boorman and Walter Donohue)
 1996 – Extract from The Fastest Clock in the Universe in the collection Live 3: Critical Mass (edited by David Tushingham)
 1997 – Short Story Embracing Verdi in the anthology The Mammoth Book of Gay Short Stories (edited by Peter Burton)
 1997 – Three poems: Someone Wants to Kill Me, The Seams and Getting Through the Day in The Bush Theatre Book (edited by Mike Bradwell)
 2000 – Extract from Krindlekrax in the collection Out of this world
 2003 – Poem The Silver Hat in the anthology Love (edited by Fiona Waters)
 2005 – Poem The Prince and the Snail in the anthology The Works 4 (edited by Gaby Morgan)
 2007 – Three poems: Dark Sky Craving, Waiting For Faces To Fall and I Am The Boy in the anthology Poems for the Retired Nihilist: Volume 2 (edited by Graham Bendel)
 2009 – Monologue Vesper in Modern British Playwriting: The 1990s: Voices, Documents, New Interpretations (edited by Aleks Sierz)
 2021 – Short story Sunday in Mainstream: An Anthology of Stories from the Edges (edited by Justin David and Nathan Evans)

Derivative works
 In the British radio and TV comedy Little Britain the character of Vicky Pollard comes from Darkley Noone council estates which is named after Ridley's film The Passion of Darkly Noon.
 The music track The Light at the End (Effect) by industrial/noise rock duo Uniform (from their 2017 LP Wake in Fright) uses a dialogue excerpt from The Reflecting Skin.
 In 2011 the Schema Arts Collective used Ridley's 2005 play Mercury Fur as the basis for a community arts project called Behind the Eyes, which took place at the Sassoon Gallery, London. The project featured an amateur production of Mercury Fur, displayed artwork inspired by the play and Ridley himself collaborated by exhibiting a series of photographic portraits he had created of the production's cast. A behind the scenes documentary about the project called Mercury Fur Unveiled was also made and later broadcast on the Community Channel in 2013 and is free to watch online.
 In 2007 performance pieces inspired by Ridley's semi-autobiographical Introduction to Philip Ridley Plays: 1 were presented by young directors under the title Gleaming Dark. This received a one-off performance at Trafalgar Studios in conjunction with the venue's revival of Ridley's play Vincent River.
 A quote from Ridley's children novel Dakota of the White Flats is used as the epigraph for chapter 6 of Cornelia Funke's young adult fantasy novel Inkspell. 
 The German band Troy Flamingo are named after a character from one of Ridley's short stories.
 The American band the Reflecting Skin is named after Ridley's film of the same name.
 Reece Nagra's remix of Buju Banton's song Murderer opens with an expert of dialogue from The Krays and became a drum and bass anthem.
 Phil Western's 1998 album The Escapist features excerpts of dialogue from The Reflecting Skin.
The song Fury Eyes (from the Creatures' second album, Boomerang) is dedicated to Ridley's novel In the Eyes of Mr. Fury.
 The Song Troy Flamingo from Madonna Hip Hop Massaker's 1995 album Teenie Trap is based on the title story of Ridley's 1999 book Flamingoes in Orbit. 
 Ridley's song Who Will Love Me Now? was covered by the techno/house band Sunscreem under the title Please Save Me. The song became a cult hit in clubs, entered the top 40 UK chart, top 30 US dance chart and featured in the film South West 9.
 The song Omlagus Garfungiloops (from Coil's 1992 album Stolen & Contaminated Songs) features excerpts of dialogue from The Reflecting Skin.
The Scottish band River Head used a photography still from The Reflecting Skin on the cover of their 1992 single sided 7-inch EP Was Away / Haddit.   
 Ridley's image Rainbow Kiss was used on the cover of the short story collection Oranges and Lemons: Stories by Gay Men, to which he also contributed as a writer.
 Ridley's charcoal drawing The Conversation was used as the cover to cult band Blowzabella's 1988 album Pingha Frenzy.

Notable awards won 
 The 2013 Scotsman Fringe First Award for Dark Vanilla Jungle.
 The 2010 Toronto After Dark Film Festival Vision Award for Best Independent Feature Film for Heartless.
 The 2010 Fantasporto Film Festival Best Film Award for Heartless.
 The 2010 Fantasporto Film Festival Best Director Award for Heartless.
 The 2009 Leeds International Film Festival Silver Melies Award for Heartless.
 The 1993 WH Smith Mind-Boggling Book Award for Krindlekrax.
 The 1993 Meyer-Whitworth Award for Most Promising New Playwright for The Fastest Clock in the Universe.
 A 1992 Time Out Award for The Fastest Clock in the Universe.
 The 1992 Critics' Circle Theatre Award for Most Promising Playwright for The Fastest Clock in the Universe.
 The 1992 Evening Standard Theatre Award for Most Promising Playwright for The Fastest Clock in the Universe.
 The 1991 Nestle Smarties Book Prize (9–11 years category) for Krindlekrax.
 The 1990 Evening Standard British Film Award for Most Promising Newcomer for The Krays.
 The 1990 Evening Standard British Film Award for Best Film for The Krays
 Silver Leopard at the Locarno Film Festival for The Reflecting Skin.
 Grand Prize at the Stockholm Film Festival for The Reflecting Skin.

Notable award nominations 
 Longlisted for the 2016 Off-West End Best New Play Award for Karagula  
 Longlisted for the 2016 Off-West End Best Production Award for Karagula
 Shortlisted for the 2011 London Festival Fringe Best Play Award for the 2010 London revival of Vincent River.
 Shortlisted for the 2013 Brian Way Best New Play Award for Feathers in the Snow
 Shortlisted for the 2012 Off-West End Best New Play Award for Shivered
 Shortlisted for the 2011 London Festival Fringe Best Play Award for the 2010 London revival of Vincent River.
 Nominated for the 2011 London Festival Fringe Best Play Award for Tender Napalm
 Shortlisted for The MOBIUS Best Off-West End Production award for Piranha Heights at the 2009 WhatsOnStage.com Theatregoers Choice Awards
 Longlisted for the Carnegie Medal for Mighty Fizz Chilla
 Shortlisted for the Blue Peter Book Award: The Book I Couldn't Put Down for Mighty Fizz Chilla
 Shortlisted for The Carnegie Medal for Scribbleboy
 Shortlisted for the 1995 Whitbread Children's Book Award for Kasper in the Glitter
 Shortlisted for the 1990 Evening Standard British Film Awards for Best Screenplay for The Krays
 Best Short Film at Cannes Film Festival for The Universe of Dermot Finn

References

External links 
 
 
 
 
 

1964 births
20th-century English novelists
21st-century English novelists
English dramatists and playwrights
English children's writers
English screenwriters
English male screenwriters
English film directors
Writers from London
Alumni of Saint Martin's School of Art
Living people
English male dramatists and playwrights
English male novelists
20th-century English male writers
21st-century English male writers